Comm100 (Comm100 Network Corporation) is a provider of customer service and communication products. All its products are available as a SaaS (Software as a Service).  The company serves over 200,000 businesses.

History 

The company was founded on 3 July 2009 in Vancouver, British Columbia, Canada. The first product (Comm100 Live Chat) was introduced on 5 August 2009. The company reached the 100,000 registered business users milestone in April 2011. The company's products and services were offered for free until the Christmas of 2011. In May 2013, the company joined M3AAWG as a supporter. In 2013 Comm100 was a silver winner of Best in Biz Awards International that year.

Products and services 

The company provides a suite of business communication tools, from customer service to marketing.  The two most popular products are:

Comm100 Live Chat: live support software  that allows users to track and chat with their website visitors in real time.

Comm100 Email Marketing: bulk email software  that helps users send opt-in email newsletters to subscribers.

References 

Software companies of Canada
Business software companies
Cloud applications
Customer relationship management software
Software companies established in 2009
2009 establishments in British Columbia